The Taylor–Wythe Houses is a New York City Housing Authority development in the Williamsburg neighborhood, in Brooklyn, New York City.

Development 
There are 525 apartments housing some 1,681 residents. The development is bounded by Wythe Ave, Ross Street, and Clymer Street. The  buses and the  subway routes service the area. The neighborhood is a mix of Hispanic, African-American, and Hasidic families, with gentrification as an ongoing process that is transforming the landscape.

See also
New York City Housing Authority
List of New York City Housing Authority properties

External links
 
 Official map

Public housing in Brooklyn
Residential buildings completed in 1974
Residential buildings in Brooklyn
Williamsburg, Brooklyn
1974 establishments in New York City